The Information and Consultation of Employees Regulations 2004 (SI 3426/2004) are a United Kingdom statutory instrument. This follows the EU Information and Consultation of Employees Directive 2002/14/EC establishing a general framework for informing and consulting employees.

Contents
The ICE Regulations require that employees are informed and consulted on all contract or workplace organisation changes. Consultation means an "obligation to negotiate" with "a view to reaching agreement". The penalty on an employer for failure to consult or follow the Regulations is up to £75,000 for each violation.

Negotiation and consultation may take place under a voluntary agreement with an employer, particularly through a trade union under a collective agreement. If there is no voluntary agreement, formal consultation procedure may be triggered by at least 2% of employees, and then requires election of a body of all staff. This procedure must "enable the information and consultation representatives to meet the employer at the relevant level of management depending on the subject under discussion".

See also
UK labour law
European labour law

Notes

References
PL Davies and C Kilpatrick, 'UK Worker Representation after Single Channel' (2004) 33 Industrial Law Journal 121
KD Ewing and GM Truter, 'The Information and Consultation of Employees' Regulations: Voluntarism's Bitter Legacy' (2005) 68 Modern Law Review 626

United Kingdom labour law
Statutory Instruments of the United Kingdom
2004 in British law
2004 in labor relations